SecuriLock, also known as Passive Anti-Theft System (PATS), is Ford Motor Company's immobilizer technology.  In 1996 the technology started showing up on select models of Ford, Lincoln, and Mercury vehicles. The keys have a radio frequency transponder embedded in the plastic head with a unique electronic identification code.

System
When the vehicle is started, the on-board computer sends out an RF signal which is picked up by the transponder in the key. The transponder then returns a unique RF signal to the vehicle's computer, giving it confirmation to start and continue to run. This all happens in less than a second. If the on-board computer does not receive the correct identification code certain components, such as the fuel pump and on some the starter, will remain disabled.

Replacement keys
Replacement keys can be purchased through the dealer or a 3rd party. The key must be compatible with the vehicle. Before the key can be used to start the vehicle it must be programmed. Programming can be done by inserting the original key(s) as well as the new key into the ignition.

With PATS I, programming of a new key can be done with just one working key.
With PATS II, two working keys are required for reprogramming. This helped ensure that only the owner of the vehicle can make duplicate keys. If a second working key is not available programming will need to be performed by the dealer.

History
For the 1999 model year, all Ford Motor Company vehicles equipped with the Passive Anti-Theft System use the PATS II system.  The PATS II system was introduced on roughly half of the PATS equipped vehicles for the 1998 model year. The other half of the PATS equipped vehicles for the 1998 model year were equipped with the PATS I system. Many 2000 and later Ford vehicles use the E-PATS system, which uses an encrypted transponder in the key.

List of equipped vehicles
PATS I equipped vehicles include the following.
1998 Contour V6 Duratec
1996-1997 Mustang
1996-1997 Taurus LX and SHO
1997-1998 Expedition
1997 Mark VIII
1998 Mystique LS
1997-1998 Navigator
1996-1997 Sable (Not all were included.)

PATS II equipped vehicles include the following:
2003-2005 Aviator
2002-2003 Blackwood
2006 Mark LT
1998-2007 Mustang
1998-2006 Taurus LX, SE, and SHO
1998-2007 Explorer
1999-2006 Expedition
2000-2005 Excursion
2001-2006 Escape
2013 Escape
2000-2007 Focus
1998-2002 Continental
1998-2006 Crown Victoria
1999-2004 Ranger V6  (In 2006, all Rangers were included.)
1999-2014 F150 and F250 LD
1999-2000 Contour V6
1999-2004 Windstar
1999-2006 Navigator
1998-2006 Town Car
2005-2006 Mariner
2003-2004 Marauder
1999-2002 Cougar
1998-2006 Grand Marquis
1999-2006 LS6 and LS8
2006 Milan
1997-1998 Mark VIII
1998-2007 Mountaineer
2005-2006 Montego
2004-2006 Monterey
1999-2000 Mystique LS
1998-2005 Sable
2002-2005 Thunderbird
2006–present Fusion
2005–present Freestyle
2004–present Freestar
2005-2006 GT
2005-2007 Five-Hundred
2006 Zephyr/MKZ
2010 Ford Figo

References 
 http://www.simple-talk.com/community/blogs/damon_armstrong/archive/2006/08/30/1906.aspx

Ford Motor Company
Crime prevention